Get Closer may refer to:

Albums
Get Closer (Geva Alon album) (2009)
Get Closer (Linda Ronstadt album) or the title song (1982)
Get Closer (Seals and Crofts album) or the title song (see below) (1976)
Get Closer (Keith Urban album) (2010)

Songs
"Get Closer" (Seals and Crofts song) (1976)
"Get Closer", by Valerie Dore (1984)
"Get Closer", by The Last Goodnight, the B-side of the single "Pictures of You" (2007)
"Get Closer", by Ben Westbeech
"Get Closer", a closing theme for the television series Big Blue Marble

Other uses
Get Closer, a defunct social networking site operated by HMV

See also
"Pégate" (English: "Get Closer"), a song by Ricky Martin (2006)
Get Close, an album by The Pretenders (1986)